AFLP may refer to:
Amplified fragment length polymorphism, a highly sensitive tool used in molecular biology to detect DNA polymorphisms
Acute fatty liver of pregnancy, a life-threatening liver condition that may occur during pregnancy